Thomas A. Sykes (born ) was an American politician and tax official. An African-American, he was born into slavery. After the Civil War, he served as a Republican member of the North Carolina House of Representatives for four one-year terms (1868–1872) and as a member of the Tennessee House of Representatives for one two-year term (1881–82).  He represented Shelby County, Tennessee. He also served as a revenue collector and gauger. He lived in Nashville.

See also

 African-American officeholders during and following the Reconstruction era
 North Carolina General Assembly of 1868–1869

References

Republican Party members of the North Carolina House of Representatives
Republican Party members of the Tennessee House of Representatives
African-American state legislators in North Carolina
African-American state legislators in Tennessee
1830s births
Year of birth uncertain
Year of death unknown
Date of death unknown
People from Nashville, Tennessee
People from Pasquotank County, North Carolina
19th-century American politicians
African-American politicians during the Reconstruction Era